Ogy or OGY may refer to:

 Ogy, Belgium, a district of the municipality of Lessines in Wallonia
 Ogy, Moselle, a municipality in France
 Ott, Grebogi and Yorke method of achieving stabilization of a chosen unstable periodic orbit